David Pacey (2 October 1936 – 6 September 2016) was an English professional footballer best known as a player for his home-town club Luton Town.

Career

Pacey was born in Luton and began his career with Athenian League club Hitchin Town, where he remained until signing for Luton Town as a 21-year-old in 1957. Pacey quickly became a first-team regular at Luton, and was their goalscorer in the 1959 FA Cup Final, which they lost 2–1 to Nottingham Forest. Pacey made 277 appearances for the club over his eight years at Luton, before leaving for Kettering Town in 1965.

References

1936 births
2016 deaths
English footballers
England under-23 international footballers
English Football League players
Hitchin Town F.C. players
Luton Town F.C. players
Kettering Town F.C. players
Association football midfielders
FA Cup Final players